Almendrales is a ward (barrio) of Madrid belonging to the district of Usera.

Wards of Madrid
Usera